Babeș may refer to:
 Babeș River
 Vincențiu Babeș (1821–1907), Romanian lawyer, teacher, journalist and politician
 Victor Babeș (1854–1926), Romanian physician, son of Vincențiu
 Babeș-Bolyai University
 Victor Babeș University of Medicine and Pharmacy, Timișoara
 Babesia
 Babesia divergens
 Babesiidae
 Babesiosis
 Aurel Babeș (1886–1961), Romanian scientist, nephew of Victor
 Liviu Cornel Babeș (1942–1989), Romanian protester

Romanian-language surnames